A small village in the Lathi taluka of Amreli district in Gujarat, India.

About 
Located approx. 5 km from Lathi (also Kavi Kalapi's Lathi) and 25 km from Amreli city. Population of the village is around 1880 people.

Notable People 
Govind Laljibhai Dholakia of Shree Ramkrishna Exports (SRK).

Savji Dholakia of Hari Krishna Exports.

References 

Villages in Amreli district